CCGS Captain Goddard M.S.M. is one of the Canadian Coast Guards nine s. The ship entered service in 2014 and is based at Victoria, British Columbia on Canada's West Coast. The vessel's primary roles will be fishery and environmental patrols, border control, search and rescue.

Description
The patrol vessel is also equipped with two Northern Lights M1066 generators and one Northern Lights M1064 emergency generator. The ship has a complement of nine with five officers and four crew and has five additional berths. The ship is equipped with Sperry Marine Visionmaster FT navigational radar operating on the X and S-bands.

Service history
Captain Goddard M.S.M. was ordered from Irving Shipbuilding in 2009 and the ship's keel was laid down on 20 March 2013 at Halifax Shipyards in Halifax, Nova Scotia with the yard number 6103. The vessel was launched on 17 May 2014 and named for Captain Nichola Goddard, a soldier who died in combat in 2006. The ship was sponsored by Captain Goddard's mother, Sally Goddard. The ship was completed on 8 October 2014.

Following acceptance by the Canadian Coast Guard on 15 October 2014, Captain Goddard M.S.M. was the last of the Hero-class patrol vessels to enter service. Following acceptance trials, the ship returned to Dartmouth, Nova Scotia before travelling to British Columbia.

References

Sources
 

2014 ships
Patrol vessels of the Canadian Coast Guard
Hero-class patrol vessels
Ships built in Nova Scotia